Daily Sports may refer to: 

 Daily Sport
 Daily Sports (Japanese newspaper)
 Ilgan Sports or Daily Sports, a South Korean newspaper